Aerated water is, correctly speaking, water to which air is added.

The term is, however, frequently applied to carbonated water.

Purpose of aeration

Sulfur compounds dissolved in water are not necessarily dangerous, but can give the water a bad taste or foul smell. These compounds can be removed in several ways, the most effective being by exposure to chlorine gas.  However, aeration can also be effective if the amount of sulfur in the water is relatively low.

During aeration, water is pumped into a non-pressurized tank and agitated.  This physically removes many of the sulfur compounds, which are then vented.  Exposure to oxygen in the air also oxidizes some of the compounds, creating atomic sulfur which can be filtered from the water.

Aeration is also an effective means of removing radon from water.

Small tanks and ponds for keeping aquatic animals such as fish or lobsters often rely on aeration to maintain sufficient level of oxygenation in the water. This can be achieved by pumping air into the water, allowing it to bubble to the surface; or by a fountain jet agitating the water. Both these methods create an agitated, large amount of surface area between the water and the air, thus allowing transfer of gases.

Wave action on the shores of large bodies of water can provide aeration of the water in the vicinity, thus providing enhanced oxygenation which can benefit various aquatic lifeforms.

See also
 Drinking water
 Water purification
 Pond aeration
 Pond

References
 
 

Water

hi:वातिल जल
lt:Gazuotas vanduo
ru:Аэрация